David Bourke (born 9 January 1976) is a former Australian rules footballer who played 85 games for the Richmond Football Club, kicking 18 goals and one game player, kicking 1 goal for the Kangaroos. He is the son of Richmond champion Francis Bourke and grandson of 1940s Richmond player Frank Bourke, the only three generation family at the club in VFL/AFL history. His career suffered from an inability to bulk up to a heavier weight, and he was frustratingly inconsistent. David inherited his father's fanatical desire to win the ball; however, his body was not built to take the punishment that this approach entailed. After 85 games in seven seasons, David Bourke was traded to the Kangaroos for the 2002 season, but only managed one game in blue and white.

In 2008 the Tigers centenary year David was nominated for "Mark of the Century" in which he took a massive hanger, against  at the MCG in the 1996 season.

References

1976 births
Living people
Richmond Football Club players
North Melbourne Football Club players
Sandringham Dragons players
Australian rules footballers from Victoria (Australia)